The 1987 Victorian Football League finals series was the 91st annual edition of the VFL/AFL final series, the Australian rules football tournament staged to determine the winner of the 1987 VFL Premiership season. The series ran over four weekends in September 1987, culminating with the 1987 VFL Grand Final at the Melbourne Cricket Ground on 26 September 1987.

Qualification

Matches

The 1987 VFL finals series was contested using the McIntyre final five system, which had been in use since 1972.

Week one (Qualifying and Elimination finals)

Elimination final (North Melbourne v Melbourne)
 were making their first VFL finals appearance since 1964, while  had last appeared in 1985. This  was the second final between the two sides, having previously met in the first semi-final in 1954 which was won by Melbourne.

Teams
This shows the teams as listed in The Football Record. Melbourne centreman Brian Wilson was a late withdrawal and was replaced by Russell Richards, while for North Melbourne Jim Krakouer was replaced by Shaun Smith.

Scorecard

Qualifying Final (Hawthorn v Sydney)
The Qualifying Final saw second-placed  host third-placed  at VFL Park. The game was significant for Sydney coach Tom Hafey as he reached 500 games as coach. In what was a crushing victory for Hawthorn, Warwick Capper booted four goals to become the second player after Tony Lockett to reach 100 goals for the season, but suffered a hamstring injury which ruled him out of the semi-final. Wingman Merv Neagle also suffered a knee injury.

Scorecard

Week two (semi-finals)

First Semi-final (Sydney vs Melbourne)
The First Semi-final saw  host  at the MCG. This was the second VFL final contested between the two clubs, having met for the first time back in the 1936 Preliminary Final, when Sydney were formerly based in South Melbourne. South Melbourne won that encounter 13.11 (89) to 8.15 (63).

Scorecard

Second Semi-final (Carlton vs Hawthorn)
The Second Semi-final saw minor premier  play  at VFL Park. This marked the seventh VFL final contested between the two clubs, having previously met in the 1986 VFL Grand Final which was won by Hawthorn. The two teams met twice during the 1987 home-and-away season in Rounds 1 and 14, with the Hawks winning both encounters.

Scorecard

Week three (Preliminary Final)

Preliminary final (Hawthorn vs Melbourne)
The Preliminary Final saw  play  at VFL Park on Saturday 19 September for the right to contest the grand final against Carlton. Among the spectators was Wimbledon champion and Hawks fan Pat Cash, who had interrupted a holiday in Queensland with family to attend the match.

Teams
The line-ups as announced on the Thursday before the game were as published in The Football Record.

There were no late changes for either side.

Match Summary
Although kicking against the wind, it was Hawthorn who controlled most of the play early in the game until Demons took the lead. The lead for most of the many until the frenetic final minutes, Hawthon’s Gary Bukenara marks just before the final siren. A 15-meter penalty, due to Melbourne’s Jim Stynes running over the mark, helped him kick a goal, with Hawthorn winning by 2 points.

Scorecard

Week four (Grand Final)

References

Bibliography

External links

AFL finals series official website

Finals Series, 1987
Australian Football League